Esin Ufot is an Oron town in the Oron local government area of Akwa Ibom State, Nigeria.

References 

Places in Oron Nation
Villages in Akwa Ibom